Notes from the Past may refer to:

 Notes from the Past a compilation by Taking Back Sunday, 2007
 Notes from the Past (Kaipa album), 2002